The 2002 Beit She'an attack, which took place during November 28, 2002, was a terrorist attack carried out by members of the  Al-Aqsa Martyrs Brigades in the city of Beit She'an, Israel. Gunmen opened fire and threw grenades at the Likud party polling station  where party members were casting their votes in the Likud primary.

Six Israeli civilians were killed during the incident and 34 civilians were injured.

The attack

On November 28, 2002 at 3:20 pm two Palestinians, Omar and Yousef Rub from  Jalbun, drove in a stolen vehicle into Beit She'an and parked it  in front of Likud headquarters. Entering the polling station, they detonated grenades and fired automatic weapons at close range into lines of people waiting to cast their ballots. Soon thereafter a battle developed which ended with the two terrorists shot dead by a border policeman who happened to be in the area. One of the assailants was wearing an explosives belt under his jacket.

Four Israelis were killed in the attack, and two others died in the hospital from their injuries. Dozens of people were wounded, including three sons of the former Israeli Foreign Minister David Levy.

An eyewitness living near the Likud offices told the media that one of the gunmen laughed as he shot people. "I opened the window and I simply saw the terrorist standing, smiling, laughing and shooting in all directions.

Perpetrators
The Al-Aqsa Martyrs Brigades claimed responsibility, and Israel named Zakaria Zubeidi, a leader of the brigades, as the prime suspect who planned the attack. This and other attacks he was involved in made him one of Israel's most wanted men in the West Bank.

Victims

See also

1974 Beit She'an attack
List of terrorist incidents, 2002

References 

Beit She'an
Terrorist incidents in Israel in 2002
Mass murder in 2002
Mass shootings in Israel
Terrorist attacks attributed to Palestinian militant groups
November 2002 events in Asia
2002 mass shootings in Asia